Mike Daniels may refer to:

 Mike Daniels (musician) (1928–2016), British dixieland revivalist jazz trumpeter and bandleader
 Mike Daniels (American football) (born 1989), American football defensive end
 Mike Daniels (rugby union) (born 1992), English rugby union player

See also  
 Michael Daniels (born 1950), British transpersonal psychologist and parapsychologist